Parrotfishes are a group of fish species regarded as a family (Scaridae), or a subfamily (Scarinae) of the wrasses. With roughly 95 species, this group's largest species richness is in the Indo-Pacific. They are found in coral reefs, rocky coasts, and seagrass beds, and can play a significant role in bioerosion.

Description
Parrotfish are named for their dentition, which is distinct from other fish, including other labrids. Their numerous teeth are arranged in a tightly packed mosaic on the external surface of their jaw bones, forming a parrot-like beak with which they rasp algae from coral and other rocky substrates (which contributes to the process of bioerosion).

Maximum sizes vary within the family, with the majority of species reaching  in length.

Mucus

Some parrotfish species, including the queen parrotfish (Scarus vetula), secrete a mucus cocoon, particularly at night. Prior to going to sleep, some species extrude mucus from their mouths, forming a protective cocoon that envelops the fish, presumably hiding its scent from potential predators. This mucus envelope may also act as an early warning system, allowing the parrotfish to flee when it detects predators such as moray eels disturbing the membrane. The skin itself is covered in another mucous substance which may have antioxidant properties helpful in repairing bodily damage, or repelling parasites, in addition to providing protection from UV light.

Feeding

Most parrotfish species are herbivores, feeding mainly on epilithic algae. A wide range of other small organisms are sometimes eaten, including invertebrates (sessile and benthic species, as well as zooplankton), bacteria and detritus. A few mostly larger species such as the green humphead parrotfish (Bolbometopon muricatum) feed extensively on living coral (polyps). None of these are exclusive corallivores, but polyps can make up as much as half their diet or even more in the green humphead parrotfish. Overall it has been estimated that fewer than one percent of parrotfish bites involve live corals and all except the green humphead parrotfish prefer algae-covered surfaces over live corals. Nevertheless, when they do eat coral polyps, localized coral death can occur. Their feeding activity is important for the production and distribution of coral sands in the reef biome, and can prevent algal overgrowth of the reef structure. The teeth grow continuously, replacing material worn away by feeding. Whether they feed on coral, rock or seagrasses, the substrate is ground up between the pharyngeal teeth. After they digest the edible portions from the rock, they excrete it as sand, helping create small islands and the sandy beaches. The humphead parrotfish can produce  of sand each year.
While feeding, parrotfish must be cognizant of predation by one of their main predators, the lemon shark. On Caribbean coral reefs, parrotfish are important consumers of sponges. An indirect effect of parrotfish grazing on sponges is the protection of reef-building corals that would otherwise be overgrown by fast-growing sponge species.

Analysis of parrotfish feeding biology describes three functional groups: excavators, scrapers and browsers. Excavators have larger, stronger jaws that can gouge the substrate, leaving visible scars on the surface. Scrapers have less powerful jaws that can but infrequently do leave visible scraping scars on the substrate. Some of these may also feed on sand instead of hard surfaces. Browsers mainly feed on seagrasses and their epiphytes. Mature excavating species include Bolbometopon muricatum, Cetoscarus, Chlorurus and Sparisoma viride. These excavating species all feed as scrapers in early juvenile stages, but Hipposcarus and Scarus, which also feed as scrapers in early juvenile stages, retain the scraping feeding mode as adults. Browsing species are found in the genera Calotomus, Cryptotomus, Leptoscarus, Nicholsina and Sparisoma. Feeding modes reflect habitat preferences, with browsers chiefly living in grassy seabed, and excavators and scrapers on coral reefs.

Recently, the microphage feeding hypothesis challenged the prevailing paradigm of parrotfish as algal consumers by proposing that:

Life cycle

The development of parrotfishes is complex and accompanied by a series of changes in sex and colour (polychromatism). Most species are sequential hermaphrodites, starting as females (known as the initial phase) and then changing to males (the terminal phase). In many species, for example the stoplight parrotfish (Sparisoma viride), a number of individuals develop directly to males (i.e., they do not start as females). These directly developing males usually most resemble the initial phase, and often display a different mating strategy than the terminal phase males of the same species. A few species such as the Mediterranean parrotfish (S. cretense) are secondary gonochorists. This means that some females do not change sex (they remain females throughout their lives), the ones that do change from female to male do it while still immature (reproductively functioning females do not change to males) and there are no males with female-like colors (the initial phase males in other parrotfish). The marbled parrotfish (Leptoscarus vaigiensis) is the only species of parrotfish known not to change sex. In most species, the initial phase is dull red, brown, or grey, while the terminal phase is vividly green or blue with bright pink, orange or yellow patches. In a smaller number of species the phases are similar, and in the Mediterranean parrotfish the adult female is brightly colored, while the adult male is gray. In most species, juveniles have a different color pattern from adults. Juveniles of some tropical species can alter their color temporarily to mimic other species. Where the sexes and ages differ, the remarkably different phases often were first described as separate species. As a consequence early scientists recognized more than 350 parrotfish species, which is almost four times the actual number.

Most tropical species form large schools when feeding and these are often grouped by size. Harems of several females presided over by a single male are normal in most species, with the males vigorously defending their position from any challenge.

As pelagic spawners, parrotfish release many tiny, buoyant eggs into the water, which become part of the plankton. The eggs float freely, settling into the coral until hatching.

The sex change in parrotfishes is accompanied by changes in circulating steroids. Females have high levels of estradiol, moderate levels of T and undetectable levels of the major fish androgen 11-ketotestosterone. During the transition from initial to terminal coloration phases, concentrations of 11-ketotestosterone rise dramatically and estrogen levels decline. If a female is injected with 11-ketotestosterone, it will cause a precocious change in gonadal, gametic and behavioural sex.

Economic importance
A commercial fishery exists for some of the larger species, particularly in the Indo-Pacific, but also for a few others like the Mediterranean parrotfish. Protecting parrotfishes is proposed as a way of saving Caribbean coral reefs from being overgrown with seaweed and sponges. Despite their striking colors, their feeding behavior renders them highly unsuitable for most marine aquaria.

A new study has discovered that the parrotfish is extremely important for the health of the Great Barrier Reef; it is the only one of thousands of reef fish species that regularly performs the task of scraping and cleaning inshore coral reefs.

Taxonomy
Traditionally, the parrotfishes have been considered to be a family level taxon, Scaridae. Although phylogenetic and evolutionary analyses of parrotfishes are ongoing, they are now accepted to be a clade in the tribe Cheilini, and are now commonly referred to as scarine labrids (subfamily Scarinae, family Labridae). Some authorities have preferred to maintain the parrotfishes as a family-level taxon, resulting in Labridae not being monophyletic (unless split into several families).

Nonetheless, according to the World Register of Marine Species the group is divided into two subfamilies as follows :
 sub-family Scarinae
 genus Bolbometopon Smith, 1956 (1 species)
 genus Cetoscarus Smith, 1956 (2 species)
 genus Chlorurus Swainson, 1839 (18 species)
 genus Hipposcarus Smith, 1956 (2 species)
 genus Scarus Forsskål, 1775 (53 species)
 sub-family Sparisomatinae
 genus Calotomus Gilbert, 1890 (5 species)
 genus Cryptotomus Cope, 1870 (1 species)
 genus Leptoscarus Swainson, 1839 (1 species)
 genus Nicholsina Fowler, 1915 (3 species)
 genus Sparisoma Swainson, 1839 (15 species)

More recent studies retain the Scaridae as a family but place it alongside the wrasses of the family Labridae and the weed whitings Odacidae in the order Labriformes, part of the Percomorpha. They also do not support the division of the Scaridae into two subfamilies.

Gallery

Timeline of genera

References

Further reading
 Hoey and Bonaldo. The Biology of Parrotfishes
 Monod, Th., 1979. "Scaridae". pp. 444–445. In J.C. Hureau and Th. Monod (eds.) Check-list of the fishes of the north-eastern Atlantic and of the Mediterranean (CLOFNAM). UNESCO, Paris. Vol. 1.
 
 
 
 Bullock, A.E. and T. Monod, 1997. "Myologie céphalique de deux poissons perroquets (Teleostei: Scaridae)". Cybium 21(2):173–199.

External links

 
Parrot Fish Profile from National Geographic
Parrot Fish Care
Parrotfish info on Fishbase

 
Labriformes
Marine fish families
Taxa named by Constantine Samuel Rafinesque